Jeff M. Allen is a Regents Professor of information science at the College of Information at the University of North Texas. His research and activities of interest include knowledge acquisition, knowledge management, and workforce development and innovation.

Allen has served as a board member of the Academy of Human Resource Development, past editor-in-chief of the journals Performance Improvement Quarterly and Career and Technical Education Research, and is the founding editor of Learning and Performance Quarterly.

Allen earned a B.A.A.S. (Occupational and Vocational Education) and an M.S. (Industrial Technology) from the University of North Texas, and a Ph.D. in Human Resource Development from Pennsylvania State University.

Books 
 Alumneh, D., Allen, J., & Hawamdeh, S. (Eds.). (2017). Knowledge Discovery and Data Design Innovation. Hackensack, NJ: World Scientific.

References

External links 
 Information Science at the College of Information at the University of North Texas
 Dr. Jeff Allen

Living people
Information scientists
Penn State College of Education alumni
University of North Texas alumni
University of North Texas College of Information faculty
Year of birth missing (living people)